The World Village Festival is a free music and culture festival held annually in Helsinki, Finland at the end of May. In 2021 the event will be held virtually.

Over the weekend, the festival offers dozens of opportunities to act for a just world and experience music, documentary films and discussions on current issues. The event is admission free and offers much to see and do for visitors of all ages.

Between 1995 and 2005 the festival was held every other year, and since 2005 annually in late May. According to the organizers, some 70,000 to 80,000 people visit the festival annually while the number of exhibitors is around 400.

Gallery

References

External links
 Maailma kylässä World Village Festival

Cultural festivals in Finland
Festivals in Helsinki
Festivals established in 1995
Spring (season) events in Finland
1995 establishments in Finland